Sabahattin Usta (born 9 June 1990) is a Turkish footballer who plays as a midfielder for Serik Belediyespor. He has represented Turkey at youth international level.

External links
 Guardian Stats Centre
 
 

1990 births
Sportspeople from Montbéliard
French people of Turkish descent
Living people
Turkish footballers
Turkey youth international footballers
Association football midfielders
Gençlerbirliği S.K. footballers
Hacettepe S.K. footballers
Batman Petrolspor footballers
Ankara Demirspor footballers
Süper Lig players
TFF Second League players
TFF Third League players